Pool B of the 2017 Fed Cup Americas Group II was one of four pools in the Americas Group II of the 2017 Fed Cup. Three teams competed in a round robin competition, with the top team and bottom teams proceeding to their respective sections of the play-offs: the top team played for advancement to Group I.

Standings 

Standings are determined by: 1. number of wins; 2. number of matches; 3. in two-team ties, head-to-head records; 4. in three-team ties, (a) percentage of sets won (head-to-head records if two teams remain tied), then (b) percentage of games won (head-to-head records if two teams remain tied), then (c) Fed Cup rankings.

Round-robin

Dominican Republic vs. Barbados

Guatemala vs. Barbados

Guatemala vs. Dominican Republic

See also
Fed Cup structure

References

External links
 Fed Cup website

2017 Fed Cup Americas Zone